Zu elongatus, the taper-tail ribbonfish, is a species of ray-finned fish within the family Trachipteridae. The species distribution is likely in temperate and tropical waters in all oceans, but has only been occurred in the Atlantic and Pacific off Nambia, the western Cape coast (South Africa), and New Zealand. It inhabits mesopelagic waters up to 1200 meters below sea level. Other common names include the scalloped dealfish and spitsstert-lintvis in Afrikaans.

Biology 
Zu elongatus grows to a length of 120 centimeters, with a silvery grey coloration with bars along the sides. The pelvic fins of adults are bright red. Juveniles are epipelagic, spending time near the surface trailing elongated dorsal and pelvic fins that mimic siphonophores and jellyfish. The diet of the species consists of crustaceans, small fish and squid. Eggs are large and free floating with a bright red coloration.

Conservation 
Zu elongatus has been classified as a 'Least concern' species by the IUCN Red List, as despite having little information about its population and ecology, it has no known major threats.

References 

IUCN Red List least concern species
Trachipteridae
Fish described in 1984
Fish of the Atlantic Ocean
Fish of the Pacific Ocean
Fish of Namibia
Marine fish of New Zealand
Marine fish of South Africa